Syama Sastri (Telugu : శ్యామ శాస్త్రి; ; 26 April 1762 – 1827) or Shyama Shastri was a musician and composer of Carnatic music. He was the oldest among the Trinity of Carnatic music, Tyagaraja and Muthuswami Dikshitar being the other two.

Early life and career
Syama Sastri, whose birth name was Venkata Subrahmanya, was born on 26 April 1762 in a Telugu Brahmin family. He was also known as one of the trinity of carnatic music. To later generations, he is better known by his adopted name Syama Sastri or by his musical  mudra (signature) Syama Krishna. He was born in Tiruvarur, in what is now the state of Tamil Nadu. He received his instruction in the vedas, astrology, and other traditional subjects early on and learned music from his maternal uncle. He was later trained in music by Adiappayya, a noted durbar musician of Thanjavur.

Although Śyāma Śastri did not compose as many kritis as his two prolific contemporaries, his compositions are still well known due to the literary, melodic and rhythmic proficiency observed in them. It is said that he composed about three hundred pieces in all.

He did not have many disciples to propagate his compositions, nor was the printing press widely accessible during his time. More importantly, the scholarly nature of his compositions made them more appealing to the learned than to the lay. Additionally, they feature a more formal form of Telugu which borrows heavily from Sanskrit. In contrast, Tyagaraja composes in generally more colloquial dialect of Telugu.

There are also a number of krithis in Tamil attributed to him. Most of his compositions propitiate the Goddess Kamakshi.

He composed kritis, varṇa(s) and svarajati(s) with the ankita or mudra (signature) Śyāma Krishna. He was probably the first to compose in a new form of the svarajati musical genre, where the compositions could be rendered solely in a singing or instrumental manner. Prior to this, the svarajati was primarily a dance form, and was close in structure to the dance Varṇaṃ (padavarṇaṃ).

His set of three famous svarajati(s) are intended to be sung in concert rather than danced, and are sometimes referred to as "Ratnatrayam" (Three jewels).  They are Kāmākṣhī Anudinamu, Kāmākṣhī Padayugamē, and Rāvē himagiri kumāri, composed in the ragas Bhairavi, Yadukula kambhoji and Todi respectively. The former two are set to Miśra Cāpu Tāḷa, while the third is set to Ādi Tāḷa.

He is known for his ability to compose in the most complex of tāḷas.

Legacy

Sastri had a number of disciples who excelled at the art. Alasur Krishna Iyer became a musician at the royal durbar in Mysore. Porambur Krishna Iyer popularised many of his guru's works. Another disciple, Talagambadi Panchanada Iyer also made his mark as a composer. Another disciple named Dasari gained fame as a noted nāgaswaram player.

Compositions 

The below sections mention some of his compositions.

Svara Jati

Kriti

See also

List of Carnatic composers

Notes

References

Sources

External links
 Compositions of Syama Sastri

Carnatic composers
Telugu people
Performers of Hindu music
1762 births

1827 deaths

People from Tiruvarur district